The Northern Sonoma AVA is an American Viticultural Area in Sonoma County, California, United States.  The appellation covers most of the county with the notable exceptions of the Los Carneros AVA and Sonoma Valley AVA wine regions, which are located in the southern portion of the county.  The creation of this AVA was largely based on the petitioning of the E & J Gallo Winery as part of their expansion of their Gallo of Sonoma brand. The viticultural area incorporates the Alexander Valley AVA, Chalk Hill AVA, Dry Creek Valley AVA,  Knights Valley AVA, Russian River Valley AVA, Sonoma Coast AVA, and parts of the Green Valley of Russian River Valley AVA and  Rockpile AVA valleys.

The majority of the grape varieties grown in Sonoma County are grown in Northern Sonoma AVA, including Cabernet Sauvignon, Sauvignon Blanc, Chardonnay, and Zinfandel. Zinfandel is more commonly grown in the Rockpile and Dry Creek Valleys. Gallo Family Vineyards are known for their Cabernet Sauvignon and Chardonnay while Rodney Strong Vineyards is known for its Zinfandel and Sauvignon Blanc.  Bacigalupi Vineyards, situated in the Russian River Valley, are known for their Chardonnay.

See also
 Sonoma County wine

References

American Viticultural Areas
American Viticultural Areas of the San Francisco Bay Area
Geography of Sonoma County, California
Mayacamas Mountains
1985 establishments in California